Spring Creek Colony is a Hutterite community and census-designated place (CDP) in Fergus County, Montana, United States. It is in the western part of the county, along Big Spring Creek, a northwest-flowing tributary of the Judith River, which in turn flows north to the Missouri River.

Spring Creek Colony was first listed as a CDP prior to the 2020 census.

Demographics

References 

Census-designated places in Fergus County, Montana
Census-designated places in Montana
Hutterite communities in the United States